Willie McLean is a New Zealand former rugby league footballer who played professionally for the North Sydney Bears.

Playing career
A Marist Saints junior, McLean began his career with the Waitakere City Raiders in the Lion Red Cup in 1994. He played for the Raiders throughout all three years of the tournaments existence. In 1995 McLean made the New Zealand Residents side when they played a warm up match against the New Zealand national rugby league team. In 1996 McLean played for Auckland in a match for the Rugby League Cup, for North Zone against South Zone and for the New Zealand XIII in the Pacific Challenge. He also played at fullback for the Raiders in the 1996 Lion Red Cup grand final, which the Raiders lost 34–22 to the Counties Manukau Heroes.

In 1997 he joined the North Sydney Bears and played with them for three seasons. He represented the Rest of the World side that year against Australia.

References

Living people
New Zealand rugby league players
Auckland rugby league team players
1973 births
Waitakere rugby league team players
North Sydney Bears players
Rugby league fullbacks
Rugby league centres
Marist Saints players